Urib is a rural locality (a selo) in Shamilsky District of the Republic of Dagestan, Russia. Dialing code: +7 87259.

Urib is famous for Islamic scholars, among whom the most notable is Shaykh Husenil Muhammad Afandi.

References

Rural localities in Shamilsky District